The 2015 Louisiana flood took place in the United States for several weeks in June 2015. The areas in Louisiana affected by the Red River Flood include Caddo Parish, Bossier Parish, Natchitoches Parish, Rapides Parish, and the cities of Coushatta, Alexandria, and Shreveport. The flood caused numerous road closures throughout Shreveport. Response teams such as the Louisiana National Guard were deployed in order to fill and place sandbags at residences that were under flood warning.

The Red River reached its highest level in over 70 years, cresting in most of the affected areas at around 6–9 feet over the flood levels. At 4 PM on June 9, the river reached its maximum height of 37.14 feet.

The most recent US Army Corps of Engineers study to characterize the flood patterns of the Red River was released in 1990, when the river last flooded. There are no current plans for another study.

Although many advances have been made towards flood protection in Louisiana, flooding is inevitable; the changing course of the river(s) will continue no matter how high the levees are built. The Mississippi River flood history shows that the river has a pattern of major flooding every decade or so.

References

Floods in Louisiana
2015 floods in the United States
2015 in Louisiana